Robert Edwin Jeffery Chambers (born 19 November 1943) is a former English cricketer.  Chambers was a right-handed batsman who bowled right-arm off break.  He was born at Bexhill-on-Sea, Sussex, and was educated at the Forest School, Walthamstow.

While attending the University of Cambridge, Chambers made his first-class debut for Cambridge University Cricket Club against Scotland at Fenner's in 1966.  In what was his only season of first-class cricket, Chambers made eleven further first-class appearances for the university, the last of which came against Oxford University in The University Match at Lord's.  In his twelve first-class appearances for the university, he scored 386 runs at an average of 17.54, with a high score of 58.  One of three half centuries he made in that season, this score came against Somerset.

He later made a single appearance Staffordshire against Cheshire in the 1969 Minor Counties Championship.  He later joined Hertfordshire, making his debut for the county in the 1972 Minor Counties Championship against Cambridgeshire.  He made fourteen further appearances for the county in Minor counties cricket, the last of which came against Buckinghamshire in 1974.

References

External links
Robert Chambers at ESPNcricinfo
Robert Chambers at CricketArchive

1943 births
Living people
People from Bexhill-on-Sea
People educated at Forest School, Walthamstow
Alumni of the University of Cambridge
English cricketers
Cambridge University cricketers
Staffordshire cricketers
Hertfordshire cricketers